This is a list of Italian television related events from 2012.

Events
5 January - Francesca Michielin wins the fifth season of X Factor.
10 March - 21-year-old acro pole flag man  Stefano Scarpa wins the third season of Italia's Got Talent.
17 March - Singer and actor Andrés Gil and his partner Anastasia Kuzmina win the eighth season of Ballando con le stelle.
1 April - Sabrina Mbarek wins the twelfth season of Grande Fratello.
7 December - Chiara Galiazzo wins the sixth season of X Factor.

Debuts

RAI

Serials 

 The young Montalbano – prequel of Il commissario Montalbano, by Gianluca Maria Tavarelli, with David Riondino as Salvo Montalbano; 2 seasons.
 The family – by Riccardo Milani and Riccardo Donna, with Stefania Sandrelli, Gianni Cavina, Stefania Rocca and Alessandro Gassmann; 3 seasons and 2 spin-offs. Soap-opera about the Rengoni, a family of Lombard industrialists.
Questo nostro amore (This our love) – by Luca Ribuoli and Isabella Leoni, with Nerì Marcorè and Anna Valle; 3 seasons. The stories of two families in Turin (an irregular couple and a patriarchal clan of Sicilians), living in the same condominium, interlace for twenty years, from the Sixties to the Eighties, till to the birth of a child, son of the two firstborns.

Television shows

Rai

Drama 

 Caruso, la voce dell’amore (The voice of love) – biopic by Stefano Reali, with Gianluca Terranova in the title role, Vanessa Incontrada and Martina Stella; 2 episodes.
One Thousand and One Nights – by Marco Pontecorvo, with Marco Bocci and Vanessa Hessler, freely adapted from the Arabian nights; 2 episodes.
Santa Barbara – by Carmine Elia, with Vanessa Hessler in the title role and Massimo Wertmuller.
Walter Chiari, fino all’ultima risata (Till the last laugh) – biopic by Enzo Monteleone, with Alessio Boni in the title role; 2 episodes.

Serials 

 Nero Wolfe – with Francesco Pannofino in the title role and Pietro Sermonti as Archie Goodwin; the adventures of the two detectives are relocated in the Rome of the dolce vita.

News and educational 

 Berlino la mutante (Berlin the mutant) - documentary by Andrea De Fusco.

2000s
Grande Fratello (2000–present)
Ballando con le stelle (2005–present)
X Factor (2008–present)

2010s
Italia's Got Talent (2010–present)

Ending this year

Births

Deaths

See also
2012 in Italy
List of Italian films of 2012

References